Mungo Park (11 September 1771 – 1806) was a Scottish explorer of West Africa. After an exploration of the upper Niger River around 1796, he wrote a popular and influential travel book titled Travels in the Interior Districts of Africa in which he theorized the Niger and Congo merged to become the same river, though it was later proven that they are different rivers. He was killed during a second expedition, having successfully travelled about two-thirds of the way down the Niger. 

If the African Association was the "beginning of the age of African exploration" then Mungo Park was its first successful explorer; he set a standard for all who followed. Park was the first Westerner to have recorded travels in the central portion of the Niger, and through his popular book introduced the public to a vast unexplored continent which influenced future European explorers and colonial ambitions in Africa.

Early life
Mungo Park was born in Selkirkshire, Scotland, at Foulshiels on the Yarrow Water, near Selkirk, on a tenant farm which his father rented from the Duke of Buccleuch. He was the seventh in a family of thirteen. Although tenant farmers, the Parks were relatively well-off. They were able to pay for Park to receive a good education, and Park's father died leaving property valued at £3,000. His parents had originally intended him for the Church of Scotland.

He was educated at home before attending Selkirk grammar school. At the age of fourteen, he was apprenticed to Thomas Anderson, a surgeon in Selkirk. During his apprenticeship, Park became friends with Anderson's son Alexander and was introduced to Anderson's daughter Allison, who would later become his wife.

In October 1788, Park enrolled at the University of Edinburgh, attending for four sessions studying medicine and botany. Notably, during his time at university, he spent a year in the natural history course taught by Professor John Walker. After completing his studies, he spent a summer in the Scottish Highlands, engaged in botanical fieldwork with his brother-in-law, James Dickson, a gardener and seed merchant in Covent Garden. In 1788 Dickson along with Sir James Edward Smith and six other fellows founded the Linnean Society of London.

In 1792 Park completed his medical studies at University of Edinburgh. Through a recommendation by Joseph Banks he obtained the post of assistant surgeon on board the East India Company's ship . In February 1793 the Worcester sailed to Benkulen in Sumatra. Before departing, Park wrote to his friend Alexander Anderson in terms that reflect his Calvinist upbringing:

On his return in 1794, Park gave a lecture to the Linnaean Society, describing eight new Sumatran fish. The paper was not published until three years later. He also presented Banks with various rare Sumatran plants.

Travels into the interior of Africa

First journey

On 26 September 1794 Mungo Park offered his services to the African Association, then looking for a successor to Major Daniel Houghton, who had been sent in 1790 to discover the course of the Niger River and had died in the Sahara. Supported by Sir Joseph Banks, Park was selected.

On 22 May 1795, Park left Portsmouth, England, on the brig Endeavour, a vessel travelling to Gambia to trade for beeswax and ivory.

On 21 June 1795, he reached the Gambia River and ascended it  to a British trading station named Pisania. On 2 December, accompanied by two local guides, he started for the unknown interior. He chose the route crossing the upper Senegal basin and through the semi-desert region of Kaarta. The journey was full of difficulties, and at Ludamar he was imprisoned by a Moorish chief for four months. On 1 July 1796, he escaped, alone and with nothing but his horse and a pocket compass, and on the 21st reached the long-sought Niger River at Ségou, being the first European to do so. He followed the river downstream  to Silla, where he was obliged to turn back, lacking the resources to go further.
                         
At Kamalia he fell ill, and owed his life to the kindness of a man in whose house he lived for seven months. Eventually he reached Pisania again on 10 June 1797, returning to Scotland by way of Antigua on 22 December. He had been thought dead, and his return home with news of his exploration of the Niger River evoked great public enthusiasm. An account of his journey was drawn up for the African Association by Bryan Edwards, and his own detailed narrative appeared in 1799 (Travels in the Interior of Africa).

Park was convinced that: 

Park encountered a group of slaves when travelling through Mandinka country Mali: 

His book Travels in the Interior Districts of Africa became a best-seller because it detailed what he observed, what he survived, and the people he encountered. His dispassionate — if not scientific or objective — descriptions set a standard for future travel writers to follow and gave Europeans a glimpse of Africa's humanity and complexity. Park introduced them to a vast continent unexplored by Europeans. If the African Association was the  "beginning of the age of African exploration" then Mungo Park was its first successful explorer, he set a standard for all who followed. After his death, European public and political interest in Africa began to increase. Perhaps the most lasting effect of Park's travels, though, was the influence on European colonial ambitions during the 19th century.

Between journeys

Settling at Foulshiels, in August 1799 Park married Allison, daughter of his apprenticeship master, Thomas Anderson. A project to go to New South Wales in some official capacity came to nothing, and in October 1801 Park moved to Peebles, where he practised as a physician.

Second journey
In the autumn of 1803 Mungo Park was invited by the government to lead another expedition to the Niger. Park, who chafed at the hardness and monotony of life at Peebles, accepted the offer, but the expedition was delayed. Part of the waiting time was occupied perfecting his Arabic; his teacher, Sidi Ambak Bubi, was a native of Mogador (now Essaouira in Morocco) whose behavior both amused and alarmed the people of Peebles.

In May 1804 Park went back to Foulshiels, where he made the acquaintance of Walter Scott, then living nearby at Ashiesteil and with whom he soon became friendly. In September, Park was summoned to London to leave on the new expedition; he left Scott with the hopeful proverb on his lips, "Freits (omens) follow those that look to them."

Park had at that time adopted the theory that the Niger and the Congo were one, and in a memorandum drawn up before he left Britain he wrote: "My hopes of returning by the Congo are not altogether fanciful."

On 31 January 1805 he sailed from Portsmouth for Gambia, having been given a captain's commission as head of the government expedition. Alexander Anderson, his brother-in-law and second-in-command, had received a lieutenancy. George Scott, a fellow Borderer, was draughtsman, and the party included four or five artificers. At Gorée (then in British occupation) Park was joined by Lieutenant Martyn, R.A., thirty-five privates and two seamen.

The expedition got a late start into the rainy season and did not reach the Niger until mid-August, when only eleven Europeans were left alive; the rest had succumbed to fever or dysentery. From Bamako the journey to Ségou was made by canoe. Having received permission from the local ruler, Mansong Diarra, to proceed, at Sansanding, a little below Ségou, Park made ready for his journey down the still unknown part of the river. This he christened H.M. schooner Joliba (the native name for the Niger River), and in it, with the surviving members of his party, he set sail downstream on 19 November.

Anderson had died at Sansanding on 28 October, and in him Park had lost the only member of the party – except Scott, already dead – "who had been of real use." Those who embarked in the Joliba were Park, Martyn, three European soldiers (one mad), a guide and three slaves. Before his departure, Park gave to Isaaco, a Mandingo guide who had been with him thus far, letters to take back to Gambia for transmission to Britain.

The Muslim traders along this section of the Niger did not believe Park was exploring purely for intellectual curiosity but was scouting European trading routes, they saw Park as a threat to their trading dominance. They lobbied Mansong Diarra to have Park killed, and when Mansong did not, they lobbied tribes further down the river. Park understood the politics and adopted a policy of staying away from the shore towards the middle of the  river while attacking anyone who came near. In the process he also avoided paying tolls/bribes to pass through each kingdom, earning the rage of local rulers, Moorish or not, who would send messengers ahead to the next tribe downriver that a dangerous interloper was coming their way. Furthermore, Park's policy of shoot first and not engaging with locals, in some cases slaughtering significant numbers of natives using superior firepower, made the Europeans something of a pariah. Park was running a gauntlet of hostile tribes in part of his own making.

To his wife, Park wrote of his intention not to stop nor land anywhere until he reached the coast, where he expected to arrive about the end of January 1806.

These were the last communications received from Park, and nothing more was heard of the party until reports of disaster reached Gambia.

Death

At length, the British government engaged Isaaco to go to the Niger to ascertain Park's fate. At Sansanding, Isaaco found Amadi Fatouma (Isaaco calls him Amaudy), the guide who had gone downstream with Park, and the substantial accuracy of the story he told was later confirmed by the investigations of Hugh Clapperton and Richard Lander.

Amadi Fatouma stated that Park's canoe had descended the river as far as Sibby without incident. After Sibby, three native canoes chased them and Park's party repulsed the pursuers with firearms. A similar incident occurred at Cabbara and again at Toomboucouton. At Gouroumo seven canoes pursued them. One of the party died of sickness leaving "four white men, myself [Amadi], and three slaves". Each person (including the slaves) had "15 musquets apiece, well loaded and always ready for action". After passing the residence of the king of Goloijigi, 60 canoes came after them which they "repulsed after killing many natives". Further along they encountered an army of the Poule nation and kept to the opposite bank to avoid an action. After a close encounter with a hippopotamus they continued past Caffo (3 canoe pursuers) to an island where Isaaco was taken prisoner. Park rescued him, and 20 canoes chased them. This time they merely asked Amadi for trinkets which Park supplied. At Gourmon they traded for provisions and were warned of an ambush ahead. They passed the army "being all Moors" and entered Haoussa, finally arriving at Yauri (which Amadi calls Yaour), where he (Fatouma) landed. In this long journey of some  Park, who had plenty of provisions, stuck to his resolution of keeping away from the natives. Below Djenné, came Timbuktu, and at various other places the natives came out in canoes and attacked his boat. These attacks were all repulsed, Park and his party having plenty of firearms and ammunition and the natives having none. The boat also escaped the many perils attendant on navigating an unknown stream strewn with many rapids; Park had built Joliba so that she drew only  of water.

At Haoussa, Amadi traded with the local chief. Amadi reports that Park gave him five silver rings, some powder and flints to give as a gift to the chief of the village. The following day Amadi visited the king where Amadi was accused of not having given the chief a present. Amadi was "put in irons". The king then sent an army to Boussa where there is a natural narrowing of the river commanded by high rock. But at the Bussa rapids, not far below Yauri, the boat became stuck on a rock and remained fast. On the bank were gathered hostile natives, who attacked the party with bow and arrow and throwing spears. Their position being untenable, Park, Martyn and the two remaining soldiers sprang into the river and were drowned. The sole survivor was one of the slaves. After three months in irons, Amadi was released and talked with the surviving slave, from whom was obtained the story of the final scene.

Aftermath
Amadi paid a Peulh man to obtain Park's sword belt. Amadi then returned first to Sansanding and then to Segou. After, Amadi went to Dacha and told the king what had passed. The king sent an army past "Tombouctou" (Timbuktu) to Sacha but decided that Haoussa was too far for a punitive expedition. Instead they went to Massina, a small "Paul" Peulh country where they took all the cattle and returned home. Amadi appears to have been part of this expedition: "We came altogether back to Sego" (Segou). Amadi then returned to Sansanding via Sego. Eventually the Peulh man obtained the sword belt and after a voyage of eight months met up with Amadi and gave him the belt. Isaaco met Amadi in Sego and having obtained the sword belt returned to Senegal.

Isaaco, and later Richard Lander, obtained some of Park's effects, but his journal was never recovered. In 1827 his second son, Thomas, landed on the Guinea coast, intending to make his way to Bussa, where he thought his father might be detained a prisoner; but after penetrating a little distance inland he died of fever. Park's widow, Allison, received a previously agreed upon £4,000 settlement from the African Association as a result of the death of Mungo Park. She died in 1840. Mungo Park's remains are believed to have been buried along the banks of the River Niger in Jebba, Nigeria.

With Park's death the mystery of the Niger remained unsolved. Park's theory that the Niger and Congo were the same river became the general opinion in the years after his death. However even while Park was alive, an amateur German geographer named Reichard proposed the Niger delta was the mouth of the river, but his theory was one of many and did not have much currency because the delta had so many small streams it did not appear to be from a great river. In 1821, James McQueen published a book, the result of 25 years of research, in which he correctly (it would later be seen) laid out the entire course of the Niger, however like Reichard, his theories did not receive much notice. A number of failed expeditions were mounted but the mystery would finally be solved 25 years after Park's death, in 1830. Richard Lander and his brother became the first Europeans to follow the course of the Niger from source to ocean.

His son Mungo Park (1800-1823) died in India at the age of 22, while in government service, and was buried at Trichinopoly.

Medal
The Royal Scottish Geographical Society award the Mungo Park Medal annually in Park's honour.

In media
Circa 1836, Richard Adams Locke (author of the Great Moon Hoax) composed a fictional Lost Manuscript of Mungo Park, in which Park explores the interior of the hollow Earth.

Mungo Park is mentioned in Herman Melville's 1851 novel Moby-Dick (Chapter 5: Breakfast).

Mungo Park appears as one of the two protagonists in T. C. Boyle's 1981 historical novel Water Music.

Tom Fremantle's 2005 travelogue The Road to Timbuktu: Down the Niger on the Trail of Mungo Park details Mungo Park's biography and retraces his travels.

Nigerian singer Burna Boy mentions Park in his song "Monsters You Made" on the 2020 album Twice as Tall.

Works

See also
Physician writer

Further reading

Joel Schwartz. Robert Brown and Mungo Park: Travels and Explorations in Natural History for the Royal Society. Cham Switzerland: Springer Nature, 2022.

References

Notes

Citations

Sources

 

 
 The Annals notes that Isaaco's account was "written originally in Arabic, from which it was translated into Joliffe [?], thence to French, and from French into English". The footnote ends: It appears to have been very badly translated, and is in many parts scarcely intelligible".

Further reading

External links

 
 
 

1771 births
1806 deaths
Accidental deaths in Nigeria
Alumni of the University of Edinburgh
British expatriates in Nigeria
Burials in Kwara State
Deaths by drowning
Explorers of Africa
People educated at Selkirk High School
People from Selkirk, Scottish Borders
Scottish explorers
Scottish surgeons